Red braised pork belly or hong shao rou is a classic pork dish from mainland China, red-cooked using pork belly and a combination of ginger, garlic, aromatic spices, chilies, sugar, star anise, light and dark soy sauce, and rice wine. The pork belly is cooked until the fat and skin are gelatinous, soft, and melt easily in the mouth, while the sauce is usually thick, sweet and fairly sticky. The dish has a melt-in-the-mouth texture that is formed as a result of a long braising process, during which the liquid reduces and becomes thick. It is generally served with steamed rice and dark green vegetables, often over holidays. The dish is often prepared with hard-boiled chicken eggs or vegetables, which are used to soak up the juices from the recipe.

Many Chinese provinces have slightly different versions, but the Hunanese one (often called "Mao's family style red braised pork" ) is often said to have been one of Chairman Mao's favorite dishes, and is served at the many Hunan restaurants across China specializing in so called "Mao-style cuisine". The popularity of the dish has led the Hunan provincial government to codify the recipe of the dish, in particular deciding that only meat of the celebrated Ningxiang breed of pig should be used in authentic hongshao rou.

See also

 List of pork dishes
 Dongpo pork
 Red cooking

References

Hunan cuisine
Chinese pork dishes